In baseball statistics, a stolen base is credited to a baserunner when he successfully advances to the next base while the pitcher is throwing the ball to home plate. Under Rule 7.01 of Major League Baseball's (MLB) Official Rules, a runner acquires the right to an unoccupied base when he touches it before he is out. Stolen bases were more common in baseball's dead-ball era, when teams relied more on stolen bases and hit and run plays than on home runs.

Rickey Henderson holds the MLB career stolen base record with 1,406. He is the only MLB player to have reached the 1,000 stolen bases milestone in his career. Following Henderson is Lou Brock with 938 stolen bases; Billy Hamilton is third on the all-time steals listing. The number of career steals attributed to Hamilton varies by source, but all sources hold his career steals placing him in third on the list before Ty Cobb (897), Tim Raines (808), Vince Coleman (752), Arlie Latham (742), Eddie Collins (741), Max Carey (738), and Honus Wagner (723), who are the only other players to have stolen at least 700 bases. Coleman is the leader for retired players that are not members of the Hall of Fame.

Brock held the all-time career stolen bases before being surpassed by Henderson in 1991. Brock had held the record from 1977 to 1991. Before Brock, Hamilton held the record for eighty-one years, from 1897 to 1977. Before that, Latham held the record from 1887 to 1896. Latham was also the first player to collect 300 career stolen bases. With Kenny Lofton's retirement in 2007, 2008 was the first season since 1967 in which no active player had more than 500 career stolen bases. Between 2008 and 2010, no active player had more than 500 stolen bases until Juan Pierre collected his 500th stolen base on August 5, 2010. He was the leader in stolen bases for active players until his retirement at the end of the 2013 season.

Key

List

References

External links
All-time stolen base leaders at Baseball-Reference.com

Major League Baseball statistics
Career
Major League Baseball records